Sitare Zameen Par is an Indian Talk show of conflict between parents and children that was broadcast on the Indian TV channel DD Urdu of Doordarshan network, for several years in the 2010–2011.

References

Doordarshan original programming
Works about parenting
Indian television talk shows
2010 Indian television series debuts
2011 Indian television series endings
Urdu-language television shows